Buried Treasure is a 1926 American short silent comedy film directed by Robert F. McGowan. It was the 47th Our Gang short subject released.

Cast

The Gang
 Joe Cobb as Joe
 Jackie Condon as Jackie
 Mickey Daniels as Mickey
 Johnny Downs as Johnnie
 Allen Hoskins as Farina
 Mary Kornman as Mary
 Jay R. Smith as Specks

Additional cast
 Charlie Hall as Man in gorilla suit
 Florence Hoskins as Farina's mother
 Jack Roach as Man in lion suit
 Lyle Tayo as Johnny's mother
 Dorothy Vernon as Gang member mother

See also
 Our Gang filmography

References

External links

1926 films
1926 comedy films
American silent short films
American black-and-white films
Films directed by Robert F. McGowan
Hal Roach Studios short films
Our Gang films
1920s American films
Silent American comedy films